The 2023 Besta deild karla will be the 112th season of top-flight Icelandic football. Twelve teams will be contested the league, including the defending champions Breiðablik, who won their second league title in 2022. It will be the second season of the league after it was rebranded as Besta deild karla.

Teams

The 2023 Besta deild karla weel be contested by twelve teams, ten of which played in the division the previous year and two teams promoted from 1. deild karla. The bottom two teams from the previous season, ÍA (relegated after four years in the top flight) and Leiknir (relegated after two years in the top flight), were relegated to the 2023 1. deild karla and were replaced by HK and Fylkir (both promoted after a one-year absence) champions and runners-up of the 2022 1. deild karla respectively.

Club information

Notes

League table

Fixtures and results
Each team was originally scheduled to play home and away once against every other team for a total of 22 games each.

References

External links
  

Úrvalsdeild karla (football) seasons
1
Iceland
Iceland
Scheduled association football competitions